Pamukkale, formerly known as Akköy, is a district and second level municipality in Denizli Province, Turkey.

It first came into existence with the fusion of two small villages, Aziziye and Sultaniye in reference to the 19th century Ottoman sultan, founded by Dagestani refugees of the Russo-Turkish War (1877-1878). It officially acquired the status of a village in 1935 and became a township with its own municipality in 1971, to be made into a distinct district center in 1991. The district was renamed as Pamukkale by TBMM in 2012.

Pamukkale center lies at a distance of 23 km from Denizli center, with which it shares the same plain. One township with its own municipality (Gölemezli) and six villages depend Pamukkale.

Pamukkale is notable for its thermal springs located in the nearby depending township of Gölemezli. These actually consist of four different springs close to each other in the same locality and one of the springs is used as a mud bath. They are reputed to be particularly beneficial for dermatological complaints. Pamukkale is within the usual touristic circuits covering Denizli center, the baths and the historic site of Pamukkale and the further baths of Karahayıt.

References

Districts of Denizli Province
Populated places in Denizli Province
Pamukkale District